Branko Vukićević (born 18 December 1961) is a Serbian former basketball player who competed for Yugoslavia in the 1984 Summer Olympics.

Vukićević played for Cibona Zagreb until June 1991, when he left for Belgrade after a dispute with the club management. He later received a sports pension from Serbia.

References

1961 births
Living people
Basketball players from Belgrade
Basketball players at the 1984 Summer Olympics
Competitors at the 1983 Mediterranean Games
KK Cibona players
KK Novi Sad players
Medalists at the 1984 Summer Olympics
OKK Beograd players
Olympic basketball players of Yugoslavia
Olympic bronze medalists for Yugoslavia
Olympic medalists in basketball
Mediterranean Games gold medalists for Yugoslavia
Serbian expatriate basketball people in Croatia
Serbian expatriate basketball people in Slovakia
Serbian men's basketball players
Yugoslav men's basketball players
Mediterranean Games medalists in basketball
Centers (basketball)